Geoffrey Holmes (19 February 1894 – 7 May 1964) was a British ice hockey player who competed in the 1924 Winter Olympics. He was a member of the British ice hockey team, which won the bronze medal.  He went on to become a pioneer missionary in Rwanda.

References

External links
Geoffrey Holmes' profile at databaseOlympics

1894 births
1964 deaths
Ice hockey players at the 1924 Winter Olympics
Olympic bronze medallists for Great Britain
Olympic ice hockey players of Great Britain
Olympic medalists in ice hockey
Medalists at the 1924 Winter Olympics